Admiral Sir Charles Saunders   was a Royal Navy officer. He commanded the fourth-rate HMS Gloucester and led her in action at the Second Battle of Cape Finisterre in October 1747 during the War of the Austrian Succession. After serving as Commander-in-Chief, Mediterranean Fleet, he was appointed Commander-in-Chief, English Channel in charge of the Western Squadron between October 1758 and May 1759). He took command of the fleet tasked with carrying James Wolfe to Quebec in January 1759 and consolidated the dead general's victory after the Battle of the Plains of Abraham in September 1759 by devoting great energy to keeping the British Army, now under the command of Colonel George Townshend, well supplied during the Seven Years' War. He later became Senior Naval Lord and then First Lord of the Admiralty.

Early career

Born the son of James Saunders of Bridgwater, Somerset, Saunders joined the Royal Navy in October 1727. He initially served as a midshipman on the sixth-rate HMS Seahorse and then transferred to the fourth-rate HMS Hector in March 1731. Promoted to lieutenant on 8 November 1734, he was posted to the fourth-rate HMS Exeter in July 1738 and then transferred to the third-rate HMS Norfolk in June 1739, to the fourth-rate HMS Sunderland in August 1739 and to the fourth-rate HMS Centurion in November 1742.

Promoted to post-captain in June 1743 (with an effective date of 26 September 1741), Saunders was given command of the fourth-rate HMS Plymouth in December 1743, the fifth-rate HMS Sapphire in December 1744 and the fourth-rate HMS Dunkirk in 1745. He went on to take command of the fourth-rate HMS Gloucester in 1747 and led her in action at the Second Battle of Cape Finisterre in October 1747 during the War of the Austrian Succession. After that he became captain of the third-rate HMS Yarmouth later that year and of the fourth-rate HMS Tiger in 1749.

Saunders was appointed Commodore in charge of the squadron at Newfoundland with his broad pennant in the fifth-rate HMS Penzance in February 1752. He went on to be treasurer of Greenwich Hospital in February 1754 and Comptroller of the Navy in December 1755. Saunders was Member of Parliament for Plymouth from 1750 to 1754 and then represented the Yorkshire borough of Hedon from 1754 until his death.

Seven Years' War

Promoted to rear-admiral on 7 January 1756, Saunders was sent to Gibraltar as Second in Command of the Mediterranean Fleet. In January 1757 he was advanced to Commander-in-Chief, Mediterranean Fleet remaining in post until May 1757. In October 1758 he was appointed Commander-in-Chief, English Channel a post he held till May 1759. He took command of the fleet tasked with carrying James Wolfe to Quebec in January 1759 and, having been promoted to vice admiral on 14 February 1759, he consolidated the dead general's victory after the Battle of the Plains of Abraham in September 1759 by devoting great energy to keeping the British Army, now under the command of Colonel George Towshend, well supplied. Saunders and Towshend were joint signatories for Great Britain after the French garrison capitulated. In April 1760 he resumed his role as Commander-in-Chief, Mediterranean Fleet and blockaded Cádiz preventing the French and Spanish fleets from sailing. He was installed as Knight of the Bath in May 1761 and, in the action of 31 May 1762, his fleet chased down and captured the Spanish treasure ship Hermione off Cape St Mary. He acquired estates at Gunton in Suffolk and at Fishley in Norfolk in 1762.

Later career
Saunders joined the Board of Admiralty as Senior Naval Lord in the First Rockingham ministry in July 1765 and was advanced to First Lord of the Admiralty in the Chatham ministry in September 1766; after a disagreement with Lord Chatham, he stood down from the Admiralty Board in December 1766. Promoted to full admiral on 18 October 1770, he died at his home at Spring Gardens in London on 7 December 1775 and was buried in Westminster Abbey.

Family
Saunders married a Miss Buck, the daughter of a London banker, in September 1751.

Legacy
Cape Saunders, on the Otago coast of New Zealand, was named in his honour by Captain James Cook, who had served under Saunders in Canada.

References

Sources

|-

|-

1713 births
1775 deaths
British MPs 1747–1754
British MPs 1754–1761
British MPs 1761–1768
British MPs 1768–1774
British MPs 1774–1780
Knights Companion of the Order of the Bath
Lords of the Admiralty
Members of the Privy Council of Great Britain
Members of the Parliament of Great Britain for Plymouth
Members of the Parliament of Great Britain for Hedon
Naval history of Canada
Royal Navy admirals
Royal Navy personnel of the Seven Years' War
Military personnel from London
Burials at Westminster Abbey
Royal Navy personnel of the War of the Austrian Succession